Tarrega may refer to:

 Francisco Tárrega, composer and guitarist
 Tàrrega, a city in Catalonia